Squads for the Football at the 1966 Asian Games played in Bangkok, Thailand.

Group A

Head coach:  German Zonin

Head coach:  An Jong-soo

Head coach:

Group B

Head coach:  Mohammed Hussain

Head coach:  György Szűcs

Head coach:  Ken Naganuma

Head coach:

Group C

Head coach:  Bao Ging-Jin(鮑景賢)

Hong Kong national team and Republic of China national team shared same fodder of players during pre-1971. Most (if not all) the players playing in the Hong Kong football league. The ROC team practically the A-team, while Hong Kong practically the B-team, with lesser quality of players.

Head coach:  EA Mangindaan

Head coach:

Head coach:

References

External links
https://web.archive.org/web/20140102194024/http://rdfc.com.ne.kr/int/skor-intres-1960.html

squads
1966